Slobodna Television, meaning Freedom TV, is a television broadcaster based in Belgrade, Serbia.

Background
Slobodna Television started broadcasting on April 13 2019, at 12:44 p.m. (a symbolism referring to UNSCR 1244) and, according to their mission statement, aims to present their audiences with information "free from political influence".

On November 6, 2019, Slobodna Television received permission from the Regulatory Agency for Electronic Media in Serbia for television broadcasting.

Programmes
Something Different, hosted by Hana Adrović
Malagurski In Short, hosted by Boris Malagurski
Conclusion, hosted by Marko Jeremić

See also

 Media in Serbia

References

External links

Television stations in Serbia
Companies based in Belgrade
Mass media companies established in 2019